The Iveco S-Way is a heavy-duty truck manufactured by the Italian vehicle manufacturer Iveco. It was introduced in 2019 as a successor to the Iveco Stralis and is currently assembled in Madrid, Spain.

In November 2022, the S-Way was launched in South America, produced at the Iveco Sete Lagoas (MG) plant.

Overview 

The S-Way debuted on 2 July 2019 with a new cabin and digital technologies.

X-Way 

The Iveco X-Way is a light construction truck based on the S-Way. In the past, the X-Way was equipped with the Stralis cab, but from Q4 2020 the S-Way cab is used instead.

Nikola Tre 

It is developed on the basis of the Iveco S-Way.

On 21 September 2022, at the IAA Transportation 2022 exhibition in Hanover, the production version of the Nikola Tre BEV 4x2 was presented, with a range of up to  without recharging.

Engines 
All engines use SCR-Systems and meet Euro 6d.

Gallery

References 

S-Way
Class 8 trucks
Cab over vehicles
Vehicles introduced in 2019
Tractor units